Marco Capozzoli (born February 10, 1988) is a former American football placekicker who played for the Tulsa Talons and Jacksonville Sharks of the Arena Football League (AFL). He was a placekicker for Montclair State University. He was signed as a free agent by the Jacksonville Sharks in 2010. Capozzoli has been a resident of Bloomfield, New Jersey.

Early years
Capozzoli did not start playing football until his senior year at Saint Joseph Regional High School in Montvale, New Jersey.

College career
Capozzoli played for the Montclair State Red Hawks from 2006 to 2009. He was named the Division III Outstanding Male Athlete of the Year by the Collegiate Athletic Administration of New Jersey his senior season. He was also named the NJAC Special Teams Player of the Year.

Professional career
Capozzoli played in six games for the Tulsa Talons in 2010.

Capozzoli was assigned to the Jacksonville Sharks on October 21, 2010. He played for the Sharks from 2011 to 2013, winning ArenaBowl XXIV in 2011. On March 30, 2016, Capozzoli was assigned to the Sharks once again. On May 17, 2016, Capozzoli retired.

References

External links
 Jacksonville Sharks bio

1988 births
Living people
American football placekickers
Montclair State Red Hawks football players
Tulsa Talons players
Jacksonville Sharks players
People from Bloomfield, New Jersey
People from Montvale, New Jersey
Players of American football from New Jersey